This is a List of Reserve flying schools of the Royal Air Force

Elementary and Reserve Flying Training Schools

Elementary Flying Training Schools

Reserve Flying Schools

References

Citations

Bibliography

Reserve flying schools